Butler House may refer to:

in the United Kingdom
 Butler House, County Durham, UK

in Ireland
 Butler House, Kilkenny

in the United States
Noble-McCaa-Butler House, Anniston, AL, listed on the National Register of Historic Places (NRHP) in Alabama
Charles Butler House (Childersburg, Alabama), NRHP-listed in Alabama
Dr. John L. Butler House, Sheridan, AR, NRHP-listed
Butler-Matthews Homestead, Tulip, AR, NRHP-listed
 Butler House (Pueblo, Colorado), listed on the NRHP in Colorado
Butler-McCook Homestead, Hartford, CT, NRHP-listed
James Butler House, West Hartford, CT, NRHP-listed
Roger Butler House, Wethersfield, CT, NRHP-listed
James D. and Alice Butler House, Deerfield Beach, FL, NRHP-listed
Hiram Butler House, Kennesaw, GA, listed on the NRHP in Georgia
James and Clara Butler House, Blakely, GA, NRHP-listed
Morris-Butler House, Indianapolis, IN, NRHP-listed
Gen. William O. Butler House, Carrollton, KY, NRHP-listed
Butler-Greenwood Plantation, St. Francisville, LA, NRHP-listed
Wright Butler House, Cumberland, MD, NRHP-listed
Butler House (Oxon Hill, Maryland), NRHP-listed
Pierce and Walter Butler House, St. Paul, MN, NRHP-listed
A. B. Butler House, Portland, ME, listed on the NRHP in Maine
Emmett Butler House, Hibbing, MN, NRHP-listed
Decatur N. Butler House, Liberty, MS, listed on the NRHP in Mississippi
Johnson-Butler House, Aberdeen, MS, listed on the NRHP in Mississippi
Butler House (St. Louis, Missouri), NRHP-listed
Butler Farm, Swedesboro, NJ, NRHP-listed
Walter Butler Homestead, Fonda, NY, NRHP-listed
Howell-Butler House, Roseboro, NC, NRHP-listed
J. G. Butler House, Dublin, OH, listed on the NRHP in Ohio
Charles Butler House (Franklin, Ohio), NRHP-listed
Cyrus Butler House, Birmingham, OH, listed on the NRHP in Ohio
 Butler House (West Chester, Pennsylvania), NRHP-listed
Simerly-Butler House, Hampton, TN, NRHP-listed
Butler House (Mountain City, Tennessee), NRHP-listed
William F. Butler House, St. George, UT, listed on the NRHP in Utah
Butler-Wallin House, Salt Lake County, UT, NRHP-listed
Roswell Butler House, Essex, VT, NRHP-listed
Butler House (Stowe, Vermont), Stowe, VT
Butler-Jackson House, Everett, WA, listed on the NRHP in Washington
Norman Francis Butler House, Walla Walla, WA, listed on the NRHP in Washington

See also
Charles Butler House (disambiguation)